Erich Kobler was a German film editor and director. Kobler directed the 1949 comedy Trouble Backstairs, He also directed Snow White and the Seven Dwarfs (1955).

Selected filmography

Editor
 A Day Will Come (1934)
 The Court Concert (1936)
 Women for Golden Hill (1938)
 The Curtain Falls (1939)
 Kora Terry (1940)
 Women Are Better Diplomats (1941)
 Attack on Baku (1942)

Director
 Trouble Backstairs (1949)
 After the Rain Comes Sunshine (1949)
 Scandal at the Girls' School (1953)
 A Parisian in Rome (1954)
 Snow White and Red Rose (1955)
 Snow White and the Seven Dwarfs (1955)
 Rübezahl (1957)

References

Bibliography 
 Goble, Alan. The Complete Index to Literary Sources in Film. Walter de Gruyter, 1999.

External links 
 

Year of birth unknown
Year of death unknown
German film editors
German film directors